The 1922 United States Senate special election in Iowa took place on November 7, 1922. Republican Smith W. Brookhart was elected  to complete the unexpired term of William S. Kenyon, defeating Democrat Clyde Herring.

Background
Incumbent Republican Senator William S. Kenyon, whose term was not set to expire until 1925, resigned effective February 24, 1922 to accept an appointment by President Harding to the United States Court of Appeals for the Eighth Circuit. Governor Nathan Kendall appointed Charles A. Rawson to fill the vacant seat until a successor could be duly elected.

The special election to complete Kenyon's term was scheduled for November 7, coincident with the general election.

Republican primary

Candidates
Smith W. Brookhart, president of the National Rifle Association and candidate for U.S. Senate in 1920
Leslie E. Francis
Charles E. Pickett, former U.S. Representative from Waterloo
Burton E. Sweet, U.S. Representative from Waverly
Claude M. Stanley
Clifford Thorne

Results

General election

Results

See also 
 1922 United States Senate elections

References 

1922
Iowa
United States Senate
Iowa 1922
Iowa 1922
United States Senate 1922